Utetheisa distincta is a moth in the family Erebidae. It was described by Charles Swinhoe in 1903. It is found on Siau Island in the Sangihe Islands of Indonesia.

References

Moths described in 1903
distincta